Strychnos millepunctata is a species of shrub or small tree in the Loganiaceae family. It is endemic to Côte d'Ivoire and grows in the lowland Eastern Guinean forests where it is threatened by habitat loss. S. millepunctata has been investigated for pharmacological properties of its alkaloids.

References

millepunctata
Endemic flora of Ivory Coast
Vulnerable flora of Africa
Taxonomy articles created by Polbot